Marro is a surname. Notable people with this surname include:

 Baldo Marro, also known as Teodoro Galan Baldomaro (1949-2017), an actor, screenwriter, film director and producer in the Philippines
 Joseph R. Marro (1907–1989), an American lawyer and politician from New York
 Natacha Marro, a French maker of shoes and boots
 Rudolf Marro (born 1953), a Swiss wrestler
 Stephen Marro, an American film director, writer, producer based in New York
 Torr Marro, a retired lacrosse midfielder
 Xander Marro (born 1975), an American artist, underground puppet maker, and arts non-profit director

See also 
 Marr (surname)